Xixia County (postal: Sisia) is a county in the southwest of Henan province, China, bordering Shaanxi province to the west.

Administrative divisions
As 2012, this county is divided to 3 subdistricts, 10 towns and 6 townships.
Subdistricts
Baiyu Subdistrict
Zijin Subdistrict
Lianhua Subdistrict

Towns

Townships

Climate

Transportation
Hushan Expressway
China National Highway 209
China National Highway 311
China National Highway 312
Henan Provincial Highway 335
Yunxi Railway
Ningxi Railway

References

County-level divisions of Henan
Nanyang, Henan